Manchester High School is a public high school in Manchester Township, Ohio. It is part of the Manchester Local Schools in Adams County, Ohio.

Background
The current Manchester High School building was completed in August 1997, along with three other public high schools in Adams County, North Adams, Peebles and West Union High School. All four schools used the same layout and appear almost identical from the air.

Controversy
The four regular public high schools in Adams County were built at the same time and all four featured a large granite tablet outside the school carved with the Ten Commandments. The tablets were relocated after a lengthy four-year legal battle over the placement of the tablets on public property.

Athletics
The school's mascot is the Appalachian Greyhound.

See also Ohio High School Athletic Association and Ohio High School Athletic Conferences

References

External links
 District Website

High schools in Adams County, Ohio
Public high schools in Ohio